Tavas is a town and a district of Denizli Province of Turkey, on a wide plain on the road to Muğla, near to the district of Kale (and often the two are linked in one breath Kale-Tavas). Population is around 12,720

History
The area has been occupied for a long time, proven by the presence of the mound of Medet Höyük, which appears to date back to the Bronze Age (but which has not been thoroughly excavated or researched). Many civilizations have settled here including the Hittites, Phrygians, Persians, Ancient Greeks, Romans, and Byzantines.

In antiquity this land south of the Menderes River was part of the region of Caria and was controlled from the nearby castle of Kale (known as Tabae in antiquity).

In the 18th century emigrants from England settled in Garipköy and Sarıabat villages.

Tavas was reported as having a timber industry in 1920.

Tavas today
Like in Denizli, there are textile and clothing industries in the area, and the town also produces leblebi (dried chick peas). This is a rural area and many of the young generation have migrated to the Aegean coast or to larger cities in search of careers (they have a reputation for canny business nous). The remaining people are mainly aging and conservative, there are a great number of mosques on the skyline.

Tavas is a small town providing a bank and other essential facilities to the surrounding villages. There is little in the way of entertainment or social amenities (a few cafes and a couple of internet cafes), although the local pizza pide is much admired.

People commonly deal with agriculture. Tobacco and chickpeas are most planted products.

There is a well-known folk dance Tavas Zeybeği, which is always performed at wedding parties in the town.

Tavas is one of the leading places in grain cultivation in Turkey's agriculture.

References

Populated places in Denizli Province
Districts of Denizli Province